The Caterham 7 (or Caterham Seven) is a super-lightweight sports car produced by Caterham Cars in the United Kingdom. It is based on the Lotus Seven, a lightweight sports car sold in kit and factory-built form by Lotus Cars, from 1957 to 1972.

After Lotus ended production of the Lotus Seven, Caterham bought the rights to the design, and today make both kits and fully assembled cars. The modern Caterham Seven is based on the Series 3 Lotus Seven, though developed to the point that no part is the same as on the original Lotus.

Various other manufacturers offer a sports car in a similar basic configuration, but Caterham owns various legal rights to the Lotus Seven design and name. The company has taken legal action in the past in order to protect those rights, although in South Africa, it lost its case against Birkin on the basis that it never obtained the claimed rights from Lotus.

History
Colin Chapman had been a Royal Air Force pilot, studied structural engineering, and went on to become one of the great innovators in motorsports design and found Lotus Engineering Ltd. His vision of light, powerful cars and performance suspensions guided much of his development work with the basic design philosophy of, "Simplify, then add lightness". His Lotus 7 had its debut at the 1957 Earl's Court Motor Show in London. They were priced at £1,036 including purchase tax but it cost only £536 in kit form as no purchase tax was required. It weighed only . Fast and responsive, the Lotus 7 was one of Chapman's masterworks, an advanced machine that surpassed the earlier Lotus 6 as a vehicle that could perform well on the track and be driven legally on the road.

In 1973, Lotus decided to shed its kit car image and concentrate on limited series motor racing cars and up-market sports cars. As part of this plan, it sold the rights to the Seven to its only remaining agents, Caterham Cars in England and Steel Brothers Limited in New Zealand. At the time the current production car was the Series 4, but when Caterham ran out of the Lotus Series 4 kits in 1974 they introduced its own version of the Series 3, as the Caterham Seven. The modern-day Road sports and Superlights (in "narrow-bodied chassis" form) are the direct descendants of this car and therefore of the original Lotus 7.

Chassis and suspension
As with the Lotus Mark VI before it, the original Lotus Seven used an extremely light space-frame chassis with stressed aluminium body panels. Although the chassis has had numerous modifications to strengthen it and accommodate the various engine and suspension setups (and to try to find more cockpit space for the occupants), this basic formula has remained essentially the same throughout the Seven's life (with the exception of the Series 4, which used steel for the cockpit and engine bay and glassfibre for the bodywork). Early cars used a live rear axle, initially from various Fords, later from the Morris Ital. De Dion rear suspension was introduced in the mid-1980s and both geometries were on offer until 2002 when the live-axle option was phased out (though later reintroduced for the 160/165 and 170/Super Seven 600 versions). Late 90s and early 2000s versions (such as the Superlight) employed adjustable double-wishbone suspension with front anti-roll bar and a de-Dion rear axle, located by an A-frame and Watt's linkage.

The Caterham 7 range was based exclusively on this Series 3 chassis until 2000, when the SV (Series V, or Special Vehicle) chassis was released, aimed at accommodating the increasing number of prospective buyers who could not fit comfortably in the Series 3 cockpit. The SV chassis subsequently provided the basic dimensions for the Caterham CSR. The suspension was completely redesigned, bringing the front suspension inboard, using pushrods, and replacing the De-Dion rear axle with a lighter, fully independent, double-wishbone layout with new coil/damper units. Additional chassis modifications resulted in a 25% increase in torsional stiffness. The CSR was released in October 2004, with a Cosworth Duratec engine and was available from the factory in either  or  form.

Engines
Early cars used the Lotus TwinCam engine (subsequently manufactured by Vegantune), followed by Ford crossflow engines. The first Cosworth BDR engines appeared around 1983, in 1600 cc  form, followed by 1700 cc  versions three years later. By 1990 the top of the range engine had become the two-litre Vauxhall HPC, as fitted to the Vauxhall Calibra, putting out 165–175 bhp. The JPE was quoted at 0–60 mph times of around 3.5 seconds and, with Jonathan Palmer at the wheel, set a 0–100 mph-0 record of 12.6 seconds. Around 1997 the cross flow range was replaced by 8v and 16v Vauxhall units which, in various guises lived on until the end of the VX-powered Caterham Classic, in 2002.

The Rover K-series made its appearance in 1991, initially as the 1.4-litre engine from the Metro GTi. This engine became the backbone of the range for the next 15 years. The 1.6-litre K-series appeared in 1996 and the 1.8-litre a year later. 1996 also saw the addition of the 'Superlight' range, a range that successfully focussed initially on reducing weight and subsequently on the bespoke tuning of the K-series to ever-higher outputs. Weight was saved by removing the spare wheel (and carrier), carpets, heater, and often the windscreen (replaced with an aeroscreen), hood, and doors. Lightweight "Tillet" GRP seats were usually fitted along with carbon-fibre front wings and nosecone (note however that items such as heaters and windscreens could still be specified by the Superlight customer if they so wanted). The wide-track suspension was added to the superlight, increasing the track at the front to match that at the back. The later Superlight-R offered the dry-sumped VHPD (Very High-Performance Derivative) variant on the 1.8-litre K-series. The R500 was initially available in kit-form but quickly became a factory-build only item. Quoted performance figures still make impressive reading; 0–100 mph in 8.2 seconds (although EVO magazine quotes 8.8 seconds). Perhaps unsurprisingly, such a stressed engine required frequent "refreshing" in order to keep it on the road and a series of engine revisions were undertaken throughout the R500's life in order to increase reliability. This culminated in 2004 with perhaps the most extreme production Caterham of all; the R500 EVO was bored out by Minister to 1,998 cc and delivered . At £42,000, the R500 EVO sold poorly; it is believed that just three were sold. It did, however, succeed in setting a series of performance car benchmarks several of which last to this day; the 0–100 mph-0 record was set at 10.73 seconds (in second place was a Ferrari Enzo costing ten times as much) and, until the end of 2006 it remained the fastest production car timed by EVO magazine around the Bedford Autodrome West Circuit, ahead of a Porsche Carrera GT. Only the Radical SR3 1300 has subsequently posted a faster time than the R500 EVO.

After the demise of Rover and Powertrain, Caterham started the process of phasing out the Rover K-series engine and replacing them with Ford engines; the Sigma engine for Road sports and later 270 and 310 models, and the 2.0-litre and 2.3-litre Duratec engines for the more powerful Superlight, CSR, 360, 420, 620 and Super Seven 2000 ranges.

Caterham has had a somewhat tentative relationship with the installation of motorbike engines into their cars. Since 2000, a Canadian firm has been selling Caterham 7 models using the GSXR1300 engine used in the Suzuki Hayabusa. It reportedly does 0–62 in under 3 seconds. In 2000 the Honda CBR1100 engine was installed into a  superlight chassis to create the Caterham Blackbird, delivering  at 10,750 rpm (although just  of maximum torque). In 2001 a Honda Fireblade engine was offered in a live-axle chassis, via James Whiting of Ashford, Middlesex. Both of these models have ceased production. There has also been at least one installation of the RST-V8, created by Moto Power; a 2-litre, 40 valve  V8 made from a pair of motorcycle engines joined at the crank. An early, pre-production review of the car/engine combination exists on the EVO website. Made by RS Performance (described in the press release as "Caterham's new performance arm"), the Levante is intended to be a limited run of 8 cars at a cost of £115,000 each.

Suzuki-engined models
In 2013, Caterham also launched the 160/165 at the opposite end of the spectrum. This used a Suzuki 660 cc three-cylinder turbo K6A engine, producing , with a live rear axle and S3-style body work only. The model was only available in S (road) specification and continued until 2018.

The 160 was replaced in 2021 by the 170, available in both R (track) and S (road) specifications. Again, this variant was only available in the S3 body. In 2022 a further variant, the Super Seven 600, was added. This features the same engine and chassis, but with more traditional clamshell front wings and a variety of other heritage styling changes.

Racing 

The Lotus 7 was conceived by Chapman as a car to be raced. Whilst still a prototype, in September 1957, it was raced at the Brighton Speed Trials and by the end of 1958 Graham Hill was winning races with the Coventry Climax-engined 'Super Seven'. The car has had a strong racing history throughout its life under both Lotus and Caterham stewardship. Amongst the marque's more famous races was the victory in the Nelson Ledges 24-hour race in Ohio when, against a field including works teams from Honda and Mazda, a four-man team from Caterham (including both Jez Coates and Robert Nearn) won by seven laps (after 990 laps) in a modified Vauxhall HPC.

After dominating open class races for decades, Caterham Super 7 Racing, a one-make championship for Caterhams, began in 1986. Caterham 7 races have since expanded to include club and competitive races in the United Kingdom, continental Europe, Canada, the United States and Asia. In 1995 the Caterham Academy, a novices-only format, was introduced in the UK. For £17,995 (2009 price), entrants get a modified Roadsport kit (although a factory-built option is available for extra cost) with a sealed  engine and 5-speed gearbox. Having completed the ARDS license qualification, the season then consists of four sprints followed by four circuit races. The Academy is designed as the first step in a well-established chain of Caterham race formats, such as the Caterham Motorsport Ladder which consists of Road sports B then Road sports A, R300, Superlight and Eurocup, or the Caterham Graduates Racing Club.

The car was banned from racing in the US in the 1960s, as being "Too fast to race" and again in the UK in the 1970s for the same reasons, which prompted Caterham Cars to boss Graham Nearn to produce T-shirts with "Caterham Seven, the car that's Too Fast to Race ...". Both bans were later lifted. In 2002 an R400 won its class (and came 11th overall out of 200 starters) at the Nürburgring 24-hour race by 10 laps, ahead of the competition that included Porsche and BMW racecars, leading, once again, to a ban on entry in subsequent years.

Current range

The existing range provided by Caterham Cars comprises a choice of two chassis types (the traditional narrow-bodied 'Series 3' chassis and a wider ‘Series 5’). All road going Caterham 7’s are powered by a 2.0 Ford Duratec engine except the 170, the Caterham academy cars are powered by a 1.6 Ford Sigma engine. All models are available either factory-built or as a self-build kit (620 factory built only).

But with the cessation of the engine production and new EU emissions regulations, the end of the engine's production also removed the "Classic" from the company's model line-up. As of 2017, the company maintains two separate ranges for mainland Europe (Euro 6 compliant) and the United Kingdom, reflecting the different legislative systems.

As of 2015, the range was simplified and is now simply a number, reflecting the horsepower per tonne, with ‘S’ or ‘R’ packages for either street or track use. Most versions (not the 170) are available on the standard S3 or on the wider SV chassis. The European models end with the number "5" while the UK models end in a "0". The range consists of the Seven 165, 275, 355, and 485. The 170 model is powered by a 660cc Suzuki engine, while the more powerful variants have 2.0 Ford engines. The UK range for 2022 is 170, 360, 420, and 620.

170 / 165 / 160 

The 170 is the current entry-level offering from Caterham. Prior to 2021, entry-level models were the 160 and 165; the 160 for the United Kingdom while the 165 intended for sale in the European Union. It is only available with the S3 chassis, doors, and windscreen as standard. There is a list of optional extras such as carpets, spare wheel, weather package and heater. It is powered by a turbocharged Suzuki 660 cc kei car K6A engine producing 84 horsepower. The price starts at £22,990 for a 170S in semi-kit form. This model, with its skinnier tyres and Suzuki driveshafts, is compact enough to be classified as a Kei car in Japan, except for its power which is above the 64 PS limit enforced for the class (although it appeared on Best Motoring with yellow licence plates, which signifies a Kei car). The car's gearbox and live rear axle is also supplied by Suzuki; this is the first Caterham with a live rear axle since the supply of Morris Marina rears dried up after the Seven Beaulieu ended production in 2003. The car received a large amount of publicity for a low-powered entry-level model, with an appearance on Top Gear, and Suzuki displaying it at the 2014 Frankfurt Motor Show. Production had to be adjusted upwards by 50%, with a third of the first year's production of 150 cars shipped to Japan.

360 
The 360 is now the second-level offering from Caterham. It is available in both S3 and SV chassis sizes and is sold in ‘kit’ form as standard. The 360 is available in both ‘S’ and ‘R’ trims for street and track respectively. 
The 360 has 180hp, produced from a 2.0 Ford Duratec engine. 0-60mph time is 4.8s going on to a top speed of 130mph.
The Caterham 360 starts at £31,990 for the ‘S’ trim and an additional £1,000 for ‘R’ trim.

Superlight 
The Superlight is available in both S3 and SV chassis sizes. The list of standard equipment reflects the Superlight's bias to track work: Wide-track front suspension, 6-speed sequential manual gearbox, carbon-fibre dashboard and front wings, GRP aeroscreen, and seats, racing harness, removable steering wheel. Quoted weight for the Superlight is about  less than the Roadsport, due in part to the lack of a spare wheel and carrier. Caterham used to manufacture an R300 using the same engine at 175 bhp, but this car has effectively now become the Supersport R. With the launch of the R500 (April 2008), Caterham made available the options of a sequential gearbox and launch control. In October 2012 a supercharged model 'R600' for a race-series above the R300-class was released, including slick tyres and a sequential gearbox. The weight of the R600 was 1139 lbs or 517 kg.

At the beginning of December 2008, Top Gear made the R500 its '2008 Car of the Year'.

Super 7 
The Caterham Super 7 is the retro-inspired 1,600cc version of the Caterham 7. The Super 7 is powered by a 1.6 litre Ford Sigma petrol engine which makes use of twin throttle bodies to aid airflow. Caterham has designed the Super Seven to have long, flared wheel arches, dials provided by Smiths, and a wire mesh grille. Optional packages include a wooden Mota-Lita steering wheel to complete the look.

Model history

50th Anniversary editions 
Caterham celebrated the 50th year of Seven productions with a couple of special edition "50th Anniversary" paint options. In addition, as part of the 50th-anniversary celebrations in early June 2007, they showcased the X330 concept car. Based on the CSR, the X330 employs a supercharged version of the Duratec engine to produce . The use of lighter-gauge steel and of carbon-fibre instead of GRP further improves the power-to-weight ratio. Caterham says that they have no plans to put this car into production.

CSR 
The CSR represents the top of the range and in some respects can be considered a separate model. It has its own chassis, suspension, and interior and is available with 2.3-litre (200 bhp or 260 bhp) Ford Cosworth Duratec engine. There is no home-build option; the factory supplies the finished car.

In 2006, Caterham introduced the CSR Superlight. Based on the CSR260, this model adds a 'Superlight' lightweight specification to the CSR, further extending the CSR260's already epic performance envelope. The Superlight swaps the windscreen, carpet, heater, and weather gear on the standard car for a limited-slip differential and a quicker steering rack. There is a 25-kilo weight reduction over the standard CSR260, this model variant also adds distinctive Superlight styling to the exterior, including a wind deflector, a carbon-fibre dashboard and wings, a black powder-coated cockpit, and a quick-release MOMO steering wheel. Of particular note are 'Dynamic Suspensions' Damper units developed by a specialist Multimatic for the car. The damper units lend the already capable CSR a further edge in terms of handling and cornering performance. It features the same 2.3-litre (260 bhp) engine as the CSR260, but weighs only  and has a power-to-weight ratio of -per-tonne.

Caterham has a number of models, such as the Roadsport, Supersport and Superlight, that are occasionally re-introduced with chassis upgrades or changes in the engine options.

Variants

Caterham 7 literature 
The Caterham 7 has spawned many books, test reports, and articles, many of which are still in print.

Lotus & Caterham Sevens Gold Portfolio, 1957–1989 Edited by R.M. Clarke, Brooklands Books, 1989, test reports and articles from magazines around the world .
Lotus & Caterham Seven Gold Portfolio, 1974–95 Edited by R.M. Clarke, Brooklands Books, 1996, test reports and articles from magazines around the world .
The Legend of the Lotus Seven Dennis Ortenberger, Osprey, 1981, reissued in 1999 by Mercian manuals .
The Lotus and Caterham Sevens, A Collector’s Guide Jeremy Coulter, Motor Racing Publications Ltd., 1986, .
Lotus Seven: Restoration, Preparation, Maintenance Tony Weale, Osprey Automotive, 1991, includes Caterham Sevens up to 1990  .
 Caterham Sevens: The Official Story of a Unique British Sportscar Chris Rees, Motorbooks International, 1997, .
Side Glances, Volumes 1, 2, 3. A fourth volume is entitled Side Glances: The Best from America's Most Popular Automotive Writer, Peter Egan, Brooklands Books, and Road & Track. Peter Egan's books are collections of his Road & Track column "Side Glances". Many feature his Lotus Sevens but there is also information on Caterham Sevens.
Lotus and Caterham Seven: Racers for the Road, John Tipler, Crowood Press, 2005, .
The Magnificent 7: The enthusiasts' guide to all models of Lotus and Caterham Seven, Chris Rees, Haynes Publishing, Second edition 2007, .
Why build a Seven? Putting a Sportscar on the Road, a personal record, Michael Eddenden, 2010, self-published via lulu.com, the building of a Caterham 7 from a Club perspective, it includes much on Lotus and Caterham Seven owners .
Roadster: How, and Especially Why, a Mechanical Novice Built a Car from a Kit Chris Goodrich, Harper, 1998, a "mechanical novice" builds a Super 7 and explores its history .

References

External links

Caterham Cars Official website
Caterham USA

Clubs
Lotus Seven owners club UK
California Caterham Club USA
Caterham Graduates Racing Club – UK
Lotus Seven Club Sweden
 Club francophone de Seven dédié à la célèbre Lotus Seven, aux Caterham, Westfield, Martin, et Autres véhicules inspirés de ce concept 
Lotus Seven Club Germany
Seven Car Club of Natal – South Africa

07
First car made by manufacturer
Lotus Seven replicas
Retro-style automobiles
Roadsters
Sports racing cars
Cars introduced in 1973